Mokrovraty is a municipality and village in Příbram District in the Central Bohemian Region of the Czech Republic. It has about 800 inhabitants.

Administrative parts
The village of Pouště is an administrative part of Mokrovraty.

References

Villages in Příbram District